Phelix teter is a species of beetles in the family Buprestidae, the only species in the genus Phelix.

References

Taxa described in 1839
Beetles